In Greek mythology, Echetlus (Ancient Greek: Ἔχετλος) was one of the defenders of Thebes. He is killed when the seven attacked the city.

Note

References 

 Publius Papinius Statius, The Thebaid translated by John Henry Mozley. Loeb Classical Library Volumes. Cambridge, MA, Harvard University Press; London, William Heinemann Ltd. 1928. Online version at the Topos Text Project.
 Publius Papinius Statius, The Thebaid. Vol I-II. John Henry Mozley. London: William Heinemann; New York: G.P. Putnam's Sons. 1928. Latin text available at the Perseus Digital Library.

Characters in Seven against Thebes
Theban characters in Greek mythology